The Force Research Unit (FRU) was a covert military intelligence unit of the British Army's Intelligence Corps. It was established in 1982 during the Troubles to obtain intelligence from terrorist organisations in Northern Ireland by recruiting and running agents and informants.

It worked alongside existing intelligence agencies including the Royal Ulster Constabulary, Special Branch and MI5. In 1988, the All-Source Intelligence Cell was formed to  improve the sharing of intelligence between the FRU, Special Branch and MI5.

The FRU was renamed  to the Joint Support Group (JSG) following the Stevens Inquiries into allegations of collusion between the security forces and Protestant paramilitary groups.  The FRU was found to have colluded with loyalist paramilitaries by the Stevens Inquiries. This has been confirmed by some former members of the unit. From 1987 to 1991, it was commanded by Gordon Kerr.

Collusion with loyalist paramilitaries 

In the mid 1980s, the FRU recruited Brian Nelson as a double agent inside the Ulster Defence Association (UDA). The UDA was a legal Ulster loyalist paramilitary group that had been involved in hundreds of attacks on Catholic and nationalist civilians, as well as against republican paramilitaries. The FRU helped Nelson become the UDA's chief intelligence officer. In 1988, weapons were shipped to loyalists from South Africa under Nelson's supervision. Through Nelson, the FRU helped the UDA to target people for assassination. FRU commanders say their plan was to make the UDA "more professional" by helping it to kill republican activists and prevent it from killing uninvolved Catholic civilians. They say if someone was under threat, agents like Nelson were to inform the FRU, who were then to alert the police. Gordon Kerr, who ran the FRU from 1987 to 1991, claimed Nelson and the FRU saved over 200 lives in this way. However, the Stevens Inquiries found evidence that only two lives were saved and said many loyalist attacks could have been prevented but were allowed to go ahead. The Stevens team believes that Nelson was responsible for at least 30 murders and many other attacks, and that many of the victims were uninvolved civilians. One of the most prominent victims was solicitor Pat Finucane. Although Nelson was imprisoned in 1992, FRU intelligence continued to help the UDA and other loyalist groups. From 1992 to 1994, loyalists were responsible for more deaths than republicans for the first time since the 1960s.

Allegations exist that the FRU sought restriction orders in advance of a number of loyalist paramilitary attacks in order to facilitate easy access to and escape from their target.  A restriction order is a de-confliction agreement to restrict patrolling or surveillance in an area over a specified period.  This de-confliction activity was carried out at a weekly Tasking and Co-ordination Group which included representatives of the Royal Ulster Constabulary, MI5 and the British Army. It is claimed the FRU asked for restriction orders to be placed on areas where they knew loyalist paramilitaries were going to attack.

Alleged infiltration of republican paramilitary groups
FRU are also alleged to have handled agents within republican paramilitary groups. A number of agents are suspected to have been handled by the FRU including IRA units who planted bombs and assassinated.  Attacks are said to have taken place involving FRU-controlled agents highly placed within the IRA. The main agent to have been uncovered so far was codenamed "Stakeknife". There is a debate as to whether this agent is IRA member Freddie Scappaticci or another, as yet unidentified, IRA member.

"Stakeknife" is thought to have been a member of the IRA's Internal Security Unit - a unit responsible for counter-intelligence, interrogation and court martial of informers within the IRA. It is believed that "Stakeknife" was used by the FRU to influence the outcome of investigations conducted by the IRA's Internal Security Unit into the activities of IRA volunteers.

It is alleged that in 1987 the UDA came into possession of Stevens Inquiries details relating to the identity of the FRU-controlled IRA volunteer codenamed "Stakeknife". It is further alleged that the UDA, unaware of this IRA volunteer's value to the FRU, planned to assassinate him. It is alleged that after the FRU discovered
"Stakeknife" was in danger from UDA assassination they used Brian Nelson to persuade the UDA to assassinate Francisco Notarantonio instead, a Belfast pensioner who had been interned as an Irish republican in the 1940s. The killing of Notarantonio was claimed by the UFF at the time.  Following the killing of Notarantonio, unaware of the involvement of the FRU, the IRA assassinated two UDA leaders in reprisal attacks.  It has been alleged that the FRU secretly passed details of the two UDA leaders to the IRA via "Stakeknife" in an effort to distract attention from "Stakeknife" as a possible informer.

FRU and the Stevens Inquiry 
Former FRU operative Martin Ingram asserted that the arson attack which destroyed the offices of the Stevens Inquiry was carried out by the FRU to destroy evidence on operational activities collected by Stevens' team.

See also 
 Stakeknife

References

External links
Relatives For Justice
Madden & Finucane
Brian Nelson

Units of the Intelligence Corps (British Army)
History of Ashford, Kent
British Army in Operation Banner
Military units and formations established in 1982
Military units and formations disestablished in 2007